Below are links to subpages listing German language names of towns and villages in different regions of Poland. Due to the country's history, many of those names have been in actual use locally, and are thus not exonyms.

Sublists by provinces

Masuria
Warmia
Pomeranian Voivodeship
Western Pomeranian Voivodeship
Kuyavian-Pomeranian Voivodeship
Greater Poland Voivodeship
Lubusz Voivodeship
Lower Silesia
Upper Silesia

Complete list

Cities, towns, villages, neighborhoods and regions

Natural locations

See also 

German exonyms
List of Polish exonyms for places in Germany
List of European exonyms
List of cities and towns in East Prussia
List of places in Cieszyn Silesia
List of placenames in the Province of Pomerania
Commission for the Determination of Place Names

External links 

List of German names for places in Poland (in Polish and Esperanto)

Poland
 
German exonyms